Dimmitt High School is a public high school located in Dimmitt, Texas (USA). It is classified as a 3A school by the UIL. The school is part of the Dimmitt Independent School District located in central Castro County. In 2015, the school was rated "Met Standard" by the Texas Education Agency.

Athletics
The Dimmitt Bobcats compete in these sports 

Baseball
Basketball
Cross Country
Football
Golf
Powerlifting
Softball
Tennis
Track and Field
Volleyball

State Titles
Boys Basketball - 
1952(1A), 1975(2A), 1982(3A), 1983(3A)
Girls Basketball - 
1954(1A), 1955(1A), 1993(3A)

Notable alumni
 Lometa Odom (19332017) basketball player and coach, member of the Women's Basketball Hall of Fame

References

External links
Dimmitt ISD

Schools in Castro County, Texas
Public high schools in Texas